Sacramento is a home rule-class city in McLean County, Kentucky, in the United States. The population was 468 during the 2010 U.S. Census. It is included in the Owensboro metropolitan area.

History

Early history
The first community at the site was known as Crossroads, but the post office established in 1852 was named Social Hill. In 1854, George L. Helm platted the town and renamed it Sacramento. Local tradition holds the name was suggested by John Vickers, recently returned from the California Gold Rush. The city was incorporated on October 8, 1860, and the post office followed suit the next year.

The Battle of Sacramento

Sacramento was the site of a Civil War battle between Union forces under Maj. Eli H. Murray and Confederate forces under Colonel Nathan Bedford Forrest. Nicknamed "Forrest's First Fight", the Battle of Sacramento took place on December 28, 1861. The battle began when a Confederate sympathizer named Mollie Morehead informed Forrest that a Union force was watering their horses nearby. Forrest used the element of surprise to rout the Union troops. The city holds an annual reënactment of the battle in which local residents participate, along with professional and amateur reënactors.

Geography
Sacramento is located at  (37.416489, -87.267839). The city is concentrated around the intersection of Kentucky Route 81/Kentucky Route 85 (Main Street) and Kentucky Route 254 (2nd Street), northeast of Madisonville.  KY 81 and KY 85 converge in the northeastern part of town, and diverge just south of the city.

Demographics

As of the census of 2000, there were 517 people, 219 households, and 150 families residing in the city. The racial makeup of the city was 93.81% White, 3.09% African American, 0.77% Native American, 0.58% from other races, and 1.74% from two or more races. Hispanic or Latino of any race were 0.97% of the population.

There were 219 households, out of which 27.4% had children under the age of 18 living with them, 49.3% were married couples living together, 15.1% had a female householder with no husband present, and 31.5% were non-families. 26.9% of all households were made up of individuals, and 12.8% had someone living alone who was 65 years of age or older. The average household size was 2.36 and the average family size was 2.77.

In the city, the population was spread out, with 22.2% under the age of 18, 10.3% from 18 to 24, 25.7% from 25 to 44, 26.7% from 45 to 64, and 15.1% who were 65 years of age or older. The median age was 36 years. For every 100 females, there were 95.8 males. For every 100 females age 18 and over, there were 89.6 males.

The median income for a household in the city was $23,889, and the median income for a family was $27,344. Males had a median income of $22,045 versus $22,083 for females. The per capita income for the city was $11,811. About 19.1% of families and 21.8% of the population were below the poverty line, including 25.8% of those under the age of 18 and 21.7% of those age 65 or over.

References

External links

Cities in McLean County, Kentucky
Cities in Kentucky
Owensboro metropolitan area